"Dancing with a Stranger" is a song by British singer Sam Smith and American singer Normani. It was written by the artists alongside producers Stargate and Jimmy Napes. "Dancing with a Stranger" was released as a single by Capitol Records on 11 January 2019. It appears on Smith's third studio album Love Goes (2020). The accompanying music video was directed by Vaughan Arnell.

The track became a commercial success, topping the charts in Mexico, Iceland, and Lebanon. It also peaked at number three on the UK Singles Chart. In the United States, it reached number seven on the Billboard Hot 100, and spent a total of 45 weeks on the chart. The track reached the top ten in seventeen additional countries. "Dancing with a Stranger" was the most-played radio track in the world in 2019, according to Forbes. The single is certified 4× Platinum in the US, and is certified Platinum or higher in ten additional countries. It won the Song of the Year award at the 2020 BMI London Awards, and was nominated for Song of 2019 at the People's Choice Awards, and Song of the Year at the 2020 Brit Awards.

Background and composition
According to Billboard, the collaboration happened through a chance encounter at a recording studio in Los Angeles. When Smith was writing a track with their frequent collaborator Jimmy Napes and the Norwegian production team Stargate, Normani happened to be in the studio next door. After talking, the two decided to work together.

Musically, "Dancing with a Stranger" is a disco-R&B and pop duet that contains 1980s-inspired R&B production. The song was written by Smith, Normani, Napes and Stargate. The latter two also handled production for the track alongside Danny D and Tim Blacksmith. Journalist Monica Mercuri of Forbes described the single as "sultry" and showing off the singer's "powerful" vocals. David Renshaw, writing for The Fader, called the song a "veer away from [Smith's] gentle soul sound". Lyrically, the song is about coping with loneliness and moving past a lost love.

Critical reception
Brittany Spanos, writing for Rolling Stone, stated the song "plays to [Smith's] retro-leaning strengths and Normani's own solo vision of being a Sexy soul-dance diva". She concluded her review by calling the song "simple and fun". Rose Dommu of Out praised the duo's vocals, calling Normani's "sultry voice is the perfect counterpoint to Smith’s own deep tone". Mike Nied of Idolator wrote that the song "expertly capture the frustration and loneliness of heartbreak, bottling it and presenting it as something both deeply personal and infinitely relatable". Billboard magazine called the song a "sexy earworm", lauding the pair's "standout vocal delivery", with Smith's "seductive falsetto accompanied by Normani's smoky counterpart".

Associated Press ranked it as the 2nd Best Song of 2019. Billboard ranked it 38th on their Best Songs of 2019 list. The song received praise from actress Reese Witherspoon who dubbed it the “Song of the Summer”.

Commercial performance
In the United Kingdom, "Dancing with a Stranger" peaked at number three on the UK Singles Chart in January 2019, becoming Smith's eleventh, and Normani's first top ten single in the UK, as a solo artist. It was certified Platinum by the British Phonographic Industry. In the United States, the song peaked at number seven on the Billboard Hot 100 in April 2019, making it Smith's sixth and Normani's second top ten single in the US, as a solo artist. In May 2019, "Dancing with a Stranger" topped the US Radio Songs chart, becoming Smith's second and Normani's first chart topper there. It also topped the US Adult Top 40 and reached number two on the Mainstream Top 40 chart, behind "Sucker" by the Jonas Brothers. The song also topped Big Top 40 chart.

In other countries, "Dancing with a Stranger" peaked inside top ten in Belgium, Denmark, Ireland, Australia, Netherlands, New Zealand, Norway, Canada, South Africa, Singapore, Malaysia, Iceland, Lebanon and Sweden. It was also certified 4× Platinum in Australia and Canada, Platinum in New Zealand, and Gold in few other European countries. "Dancing with a Stranger" was the most-played global radio song in 2019, according to Forbes. The song was also the 4th most played song on radio in 2019 in the US, receiving over 3.134 billion audience impressions, according to Billboard.

In March 2021, the single was named by the Official Charts, as one of the most-streamed songs by a female artist in the United Kingdom. As of March 2022, the song surpassed over three billion streams. It has sold over ten million units worldwide according to Capitol Records.

Usage in the media and copyright accusations

Usage in the media 
During Season 17 of the BBC One television series Strictly Come Dancing, contestants Dev Griffin and Dianne Buswell danced the Cha-Cha-Cha to the track. Lara Cimic covered the song for Junior Eurovision Éire, Ireland's national selection for the Junior Eurovision Song Contest 2022. Maksim Chmerkovskiy danced to the song in an episode of The Masked Dancer.

"Dancing with a Stranger" was selected by music executive Clive Davis for his quarantine playlist, which compiled songs that him and Barry Manilow considered to be "the most impactful and lasting songs of the 21st century", that the latter was set to cover.

Cover versions 
5 Seconds of Summer performed a cover of the song for BBC Radio 1's Live Lounge. The band's version won an IHeartRadio Music Award for Best Cover Song. Sam Fender also performed a rendition of "Dancing with a Stranger" for BBC Radio 1's Live Lounge. English singer Mabel covered the track for MTV. Kelly Clarkson sang a rendition of the track for her Meaning of Life Tour, and told the audience that the two singers inspire her to "keep making music."

Lawsuit 
In 2022, Smith, Normani and Stargate were all sued by Jordan Vincent, Christopher Miranda and Rosco Banlaoi, who alleged that "Dancing with a Stranger" copied their 2015 song of the same name. According to Vincent, Miranda and Banlaoi, "The hook/chorus in both songs — the most significant part and artistic aspect of these works — contains the lyrics ‘dancing with a stranger’ being sung over a nearly identical melody and musical composition", the music video was also named in the infringement as both songs' videos contain similar elements.

Awards and nominations

Music video
The music video was released on 29 January 2019. The video was directed by Vaughan Arnell, and was shot in London. It features Smith and Normani moving and dancing through a "sleek, stark home" while being surrounded by hologram projections of dancers.

The music video for "Dancing with a Stranger" was the most viewed video in the United Kingdom on Vevo in 2019, and was the second most viewed video in the United Kingdom on YouTube of 2019.

Formats and track listings
Digital download
"Dancing with a Stranger" – 2:51

Digital download (Acoustic)
"Dancing with a Stranger" (Acoustic) – 3:07

Digital download (Cheat Codes Remix)
"Dancing with a Stranger" (Cheat Codes Remix) – 2:39

12-inch vinyl
"Dancing with a Stranger" – 2:51
"Dancing with a Stranger" (Instrumental) – 2:51

Credits and personnel
Credits adapted from Tidal.

 Sam Smith – vocals, songwriting
 Normani – vocals, songwriting
 Jimmy Napes – songwriting, production
 Stargate – songwriting, production, music production
 Randy Merrill – master engineering
 Kevin "KD" Davis – mixing

Charts

Weekly charts

Year-end charts

Certifications

Release history

References

External links

2019 singles
2019 songs
Sam Smith (singer) songs
Normani songs
Songs written by Sam Smith (singer)
Songs written by Normani
Songs written by Jimmy Napes
Songs written by Tor Erik Hermansen
Songs written by Mikkel Storleer Eriksen
Song recordings produced by Stargate (record producers)
Torch songs
Disco songs
Male–female vocal duets
Capitol Records singles
Songs about dancing
Songs about loneliness
Number-one singles in Iceland